Cladonia evansii, known as Evans' deer moss or Evans' reindeer moss, is a lichen in the family Cladoniaceae. It is found in the Southeastern United States, with a few instances in Cuba. The species was first formally named by Henry Nicollon des Abbayes.

References

evansii